Fernand Gignac (March 23, 1934 – August 18, 2006) was a French Canadian singer and actor.

Beside his music career under the label Fleur-de-Lis, Gignac also starred in several television series (including Symphorien, 1968).

Gignac died on Friday, August 18, 2006, at the Hôpital Saint-Luc, Montreal, of complications due to hepatitis, aged 72.

References

External links
 

1934 births
2006 deaths
Deaths from hepatitis
Canadian male television actors
Canadian pop singers
Male actors from Montreal
Singers from Montreal
20th-century Canadian male singers